Sinate is a New Zealand death/thrash metal band.

History
The band was formed in 2001 (and went under the name 'Desecrator') but did not release their debut album, Beyond Human, until September 2005.

The band had disbanded in 2003 when Sam Sheppard joined 8 Foot Sativa, followed by Matt Sheppard—but both left 8 Foot Sativa to reform Sinate in June 2005, joined by 8 Foot Sativa guitar technician Sean Parkinson and former Reprobate member Antony "The Colonel" Folwell.

In 2009 Sean Parkinson was replaced by Matt Fawcett on guitar. Fawcett had supported Sinate in shows around New Zealand as the frontman for his band 'Damned Age', for which he performed vocals & guitar. Sinate left New Zealand to live & work in Europe. Some time previous to their departure Antony Folwell left the band. They initially based themselves in Stockholm, Sweden. They found a new bass player & settled in Berlin, Germany.

In early 2010 they toured Europe supporting Marduk & Vader on many dates of their 'Funeral Nation Tour', establishing their name across Europe.

November 2010 sees them return home to New Zealand to do a national tour and spend time with relatives.

23 November 2010 Sinate announce signing to San Francisco label ((Apocrypha Records)) to release their 3rd full-length album 'To The Death' in 2011.

Late 2010 saw the departure of bassist Munro Goodwin. Brent Fox, formerly the bassist for 8 Foot Sativa, joined as a permanent member to fill in bass duties.

Line-ups

Early line-up
 Matt Sheppard - vocals, guitar
 Steve Dogg - guitar
 Bruce Klingenberg - bass
 Sam Sheppard - drums

Line up from 2005-2008
 Matt Sheppard - vocals, guitar
 Sean Parkinson - guitar
 Antony "Colonel" Folwell - bass
 Sam Sheppard - drums

Current line-up
 Matt Sheppard - vocals, guitar
 Matt Fawcett - lead guitar
 Brent Fox - Bass
 Sam Sheppard - drums

Discography

External links
 Sinate's Official Website
 Sinate's Official Forums
 Sinate's MySpace Profile
 Sinate Interview on NZRock.com

New Zealand death metal musical groups
Musical groups established in 2001
Thrash metal musical groups